A.S. Sambenedettese S.r.l. is an Italian association football club, based in San Benedetto del Tronto, Marche. Sambenedettese currently plays in Serie D.

History

Foundation 
The club was founded in 1923 as U.S. Sambenedettese, and spent 21 seasons in Serie B (last time in 1989) and 39 seasons in Serie C/LegaPro.

The first refoundation 
In 1994 the sports title of Sambenedettese S.p.A. was transferred to a new company named A.S. Sambenedettese Calcio that assumes the debts of the previous company.

The second refoundation 
In 2006 the sports title of S.S. Sambenedettese Calcio was transferred to a new company of the same name (P.IVA 01702690445).

The third refoundation 
The club was refounded in 2009 as U.S. Sambenedettese 1923 by the company U.S. Sambenedettese 2009 S.S.D. A.R.L.

In 2012–13 season it won Group F of Serie D, but it was not promoted to Lega Pro Seconda Divisione as it was excluded by Federal Council's decision for incomplete documentation of submission to the league. The company behind the club also changed the name to U.S. Sambenedettese 1923 S.r.l. at that time.

The fourth refoundation 
In summer 2013 the club was refound as A.S.D. Sambenedettese Calcio by the entrepreneur Gianni Moneti restarting from Eccellenza. with the 2013–14 season seeing the club claim the victory in Eccellenza Marche and promotion from Serie D. The next year Manolo Bucci joined the company with Moneti, with the new company aiming to win the Serie D Girone F, but at the end of season the club finished in third place and lost the first match of the play-offs. On 17 June 2015 Bucci left Sambenedettese and Moneti looked for another partner. On 4 August 2015 Moneti, sold the company to Franco Fedeli, who two days later submitted repechage to apply for Lega Pro to FIGC.

In 2016 the club were promoted back to Lega Pro as the Group F winner of 2015–16 Serie D. The club was known as S.S.D. Sambenedettese ARL at that time. At the start of 2016–17 season the company behind the club changed the name to S.S. Sambenedettese S.r.l. (P.IVA 02177180441), but marketing as S.S. Sambenedettese Calcio. On 2020, the club was sold by Franco Fedeli to Italian-Argentine entrepreneur and Bangor City F.C. owner Domenico Serafino. However, less than a year later, after Serafino's failure to comply with several financial requirements, the club was declared bankrupt.

The fifth refoundation 
The club's name was then assigned to entrepreneur Roberto Renzi and  the club was refounded as A.S. Sambenedettese. After repaying all debts, was formally accepted by the Italian Football Federation, this way maintaining their spot in the Serie C league.  The club was however excluded from Serie C due to financial irregularities and successively admitted to Serie D following a successful appeal and the payment of a league membership fee.

Players

First team squad

Colors and badge 
The team's colors are red and blue.

Rivalries 
The main rivalry is with Ascoli. They are in the same province – Province of Ascoli Piceno.

Honours
Coppa Italia Serie C
Winners: 1991–92

References

External links 
Official site

 
Football clubs in Italy
Football clubs in the Marche
Association football clubs established in 1923
Serie B clubs
Serie C clubs
Province of Ascoli Piceno
1923 establishments in Italy
Coppa Italia Serie C winning clubs